The Moncton Hospital is a Canadian hospital in Moncton, New Brunswick.

The Moncton Hospital operates as a tertiary care referral hospital for New Brunswick, as well as neighbouring regions of northeastern Nova Scotia (Cumberland County) and the province of Prince Edward Island.  It has specialization in neurosurgery and trauma care services.

Operated by Horizon Health Network, the Moncton Hospital traces its history to 1895. The Moncton Hospital is also a teaching hospital for the Faculty of Medicine at Dalhousie University in Halifax, Nova Scotia.

Services
 Addictions and Psychiatry
 Clinical Services
 Day surgery
 Dermatology
 Ear, Nose & Throat (Otolaryngology)
 Emergency Department
 Family Medicine
 General Surgery
 Gynecology Surgery
 Gastroenterology
 Geriatrics / Restorative Care
 Intensive Care Unit (ICU)
 Internal Medicine
 Neurology
 Neurosurgery
 Neonatal Intensive Care Unit (NICU)
 Minor Surgery
 Obstetrics
 Oncology
 Ophthalmology (Eye) Surgery
 Orthopedic Surgery
 Plastic Surgery
 Pediatric Intensive Care Unit
 Drug rehabilitation
 Physical medicine and rehabilitation
 Rheumatology
 Thoracic Surgery
 Urology Surgery
 Vascular Surgery
 Support and Therapy
 Diagnostics and Testing
 Clinics
 Other Services

See also
 Greater Moncton
 List of hospitals in New Brunswick

References

External links
 The Moncton Hospital web site

Hospitals in New Brunswick
Teaching hospitals in Canada
Hospitals established in 1895
Buildings and structures in Moncton
1895 establishments in Canada